The following is a complete list of first-round draft picks selected by the BC Lions of the Canadian Football League. The Lions began participating in the Canadian College Draft in 1956 when western teams were permitted to make selections. From 1960-1962, only eastern teams and the Calgary Stampeders participated in the draft as the other western clubs signed players from universities in their area. This list also includes all territorial exemptions from 1973, when teams were first permitted to selected players within their designated area, until 1985 when these exemptions were abolished.

The BC Lions have had the first overall selection in the draft seven times, most recently in the 2020 CFL Draft. Since 1966, the Lions have only ever lost their first round pick six times, in the 1959, 1963, 1966, 1997, 2014, and 2019 CFL Drafts, due to trades. Not including territorial exemptions, the most first-round picks the Lions have had in one year is three, which first occurred in the 2006 CFL Draft and then again in the 2009 CFL Draft.

Player selections

References

 

Draft 1
BC Lions